Seh Chahan (also Romanized as Seh Chāhān) is a village in Esmailabad Rural District, in the Central District of Khash County, Sistan and Baluchestan Province, Iran. At the 2006 census, its population was 54, in 9 families.

References 

Populated places in Khash County